Alar Kaljuvee (born 9 April 1961) is an Estonian volleyball coach and sport pedagogue.

He was born in Misso, Võru County. In 1983 he graduated from University of Tartu's Institute of Physical Education.

1973–1983 he practiced volleyball, coached by Taavo Veski ja Henno Linn.

Since 1983 he has worked as a volleyball coach. He has been the head coach of volleyball club Tartu Pro Sport (Estonian champion in 1996). In 2000s he was the head coach of Tartu Pere Leib (won medals in Estonian championships).

In 1996, the Estonian Volleyball Federation named him Best Women's Coach of the Year, and 2002–2004 Best Men's Coach of the Year.

References

Living people
1961 births
Estonian men's volleyball players
Estonian sports coaches
University of Tartu alumni
People from Rõuge Parish